Reginald Horace Cumner (31 March 1918 – 18 January 1999) was a Wales international footballer. A forward, he played for Arsenal, Margate, Hull City, Notts County, Watford, Scunthorpe United, Bradford City, Poole Town, and Bridport. He won three international caps in the 1939 British Home Championship, scoring one goal.

Club career
Cumner moved from Aberaman Athletic to Arsenal. He was loaned out to Margate and Hull City. He played for Arsenal in the 1938 FA Charity Shield at Highbury, which ended in a 2–1 victory over Preston North End. During World War II he guested for Cardiff City, Fulham, Greenock Morton, Liverpool, Portsmouth, Swansea Town, Aberaman Athletic, Port Vale, Clapton Orient and Plymouth Argyle. He suffered severe burns during the war whilst on service for the Royal Marines.

In August 1946, he signed for Notts County in part-exchange for Ian McPherson. He helped the Magpies to 12th and sixth place in the Third Division South in 1946–47 and 1947–48. He left Meadow Lane and switched to league rivals Watford. He helped Eddie Hapgood's "Hornets" to finish 17th in 1948–49 and sixth in 1949–50.

After departing Vicarage Road, he joined Leslie Jones's Scunthorpe United. He helped the "Iron" to mid-table finishes in the Third Division North in 1950–51, 1951–52, and 1952–53. He never played another game in the Football League after leaving the Old Showground, as he was signed to Ivor Powell's Bradford City, but never got onto the pitch at Valley Parade. He later moved into non-league football with Poole Town (Western League), Bridport (Dorset Combination), and Swanage Town.

International career
Cumner earned three full caps for Wales, and scored in the 1938–39 British Home Championship 3–1 defeat of Ireland.

Career statistics
Source:

Honours
Arsenal
FA Charity Shield: 1938

Wales
British Home Championship: 1938–39 (shared)

References

1918 births
1999 deaths
People from Cynon Valley
Sportspeople from Rhondda Cynon Taf
Welsh footballers
Wales international footballers
Royal Marines personnel of World War II
Association football forwards
Aberaman Athletic F.C. players
Arsenal F.C. players
Margate F.C. players
Hull City A.F.C. players
Cardiff City F.C. wartime guest players
Fulham F.C. wartime guest players
Liverpool F.C. wartime guest players
Portsmouth F.C. wartime guest players
Swansea Town A.F.C. wartime guest players
Port Vale F.C. wartime guest players
Clapton Orient F.C. wartime guest players
Plymouth Argyle F.C. wartime guest players
Notts County F.C. players
Watford F.C. players
Scunthorpe United F.C. players
Bradford City A.F.C. players
Poole Town F.C. players
Bridport F.C. players
English Football League players
Western Football League players
Burn survivors
Greenock Morton F.C. wartime guest players